Lepetellidae is a taxonomic family of small deepwater sea snails or limpets, marine gastropod molluscs in the superfamily Lepetelloidea in the clade Vetigastropoda (according to the taxonomy of the Gastropoda by Bouchet & Rocroi, 2005). (It was in the order Cocculiniformia before).

Taxonomy 
This family consists of two following subfamilies (according to the taxonomy of the Gastropoda by Bouchet & Rocroi, 2005):
 Lepetellinae Dall, 1882
 Choristellinae Bouchet & Warén, 1979

Genera
Genera within the family Lepetellidae include:
 Bichoristes McLean, 1992
 Bogia Dantart & Luque, 1994
 Choristella Bush, 1897
 Lepetella  Verrill, 1880
 Tecticrater Dall, 1956
 Tectisumen Finley, 1927

References